Carlo Butti (1 September 1891 – 14 March 1971) was an Italian decathlete who competed at the 1920 Summer Olympics,

Biography
He specialized in throws, but versatile to the point of participating in the Olympic Games in Antwerp 1920 in the decathlon. He has been nine times Italian champion in four different disciplines of athletics.

From 1929 to 1930 he was secretary of the Italian Athletics Federation (FIDAL) with the president Augusto Turati, a role that he continued to hold for a few months also in 1931, with the president Luigi Ridolfi.

National titles
 Italian Athletics Championships
 Standing high jump: 1914 (1)
 Stone throw: 1921, 1922 (2)
 Vibrated ball: 1919, 1920, 1921, 1922 (4)
 Team vibrated ball: 1920, 1921 (2)

See also
 Men's high jump Italian record progression

References

External links 
 
 

1891 births
1971 deaths
Athletes from Milan
Athletes (track and field) at the 1920 Summer Olympics
Italian decathletes
Olympic athletes of Italy
Olympic decathletes